Patricia Janine Dusaran Berdin (born January 28, 2002), simply known as Janine Berdin, is a Filipino singer, songwriter and actress. She rose to fame when she was crowned as the grand champion of the second season of Tawag ng Tanghalan on It's Showtime.

Berdin began her career as a child actress after appearing in Star Circle Quest: Search for the Next Kiddie Superstars, she appeared in several ABS-CBN TV series after her stint on the contest and prior to her singing career. After a five year hiatus because of academic reasons, she tried her luck in Tawag ng Tanghalan and emerged as the competition's winner.

Her 2022 single "Mahika" with Adie reached No. 1 on the Billboard Philippines Songs chart.  Her debut EP "WTF I actually wrote these songs" was released on 2022. Currently, she appears regularly on the variety show ASAP Natin 'To.

Career
Berdin first appeared on ABS-CBN, where she competed in the fourth season of Star Circle Quest: Search for the Next Kiddie Superstars. Berdin finished as the 4th female semi-finalist.

After the contest she was endorsed to ABS-CBN's Star Magic to be one of their talents. She also participated in some Star Magic activities including Star Magic Games 2012 and the ABS-CBN 2012 Christmas Station ID.

Berdin attempted to audition for The Voice Kids, but was not chosen to appear in the show. In 2017, she also tried to audition for the first season of Tawag ng Tanghalan, but was still not accepted. She auditioned again during the following season and received the call to compete for the fourth quarter of the season.

Tawag ng Tanghalan: Season 2

On January 24, 2018, Janine participated in the Season 2, Quarter IV of Tawag ng Tanghalan on It's Showtime, a singing competition on ABS-CBN. She was introduced as a Singing Young military trainee and was dubbed as the "Cadets My Girl ng Cebu". On her first performance, she sang her rendition of Magasin by Eraserheads, where she emerged as the daily winner.

Season 2, Quarter IV – Semi-finals
On February 5, 2018, Berdin defended the golden microphone for five consecutive days. Consequently, at the age of 16 years old, she became the first semi-finalist of TNT Season 2, Quarter IV, followed by Mark Douglas Dagal, Aljun Alborme, Arabelle Dela Cruz, and Reggie Tortugo, Adelene Rabulan, Arbie Baula, JM Bales and Christian Bahaya. The nine semi-finalists competed during the week-long Semi-finals starting May 12, 2018. Berdin performed daily during the rounds and earned a standing ovation and praises from the judges on the Round 4, with her rendition of "Banal Na Aso, Santong Kabayo" by Yano. In the next round, Berdin performed an emotional rendition of Narda by Kamikazee which earned another standing ovation and moved one of the judges Ogie Alcasid into tears. On the last day of the Semi-finals, Berdin received her third standing ovation and earned the highest combined score of 97.98% and advanced to the grand finals, alongside Reggie Tortugo, who received the score of 60.84%.

Season 2, Grand Finals
Twelve TNT Season 2 Grand Finalists were to perform in the week-long competition that took place on May 28–June 2, 2018 held at the Aliw Theater. During the first round of the Grand Finals, Berdin performed Eraserheads' With A Smile and garnered a combined score of 98.2% eventually becoming part of the Top 6. During the live finale, after performing Bamboo's Tatsulok/Noypi/Hallelujah medley, Berdin earned the highest combined score of 96.11% to emerged as the Grand Champion followed by Ato Arman (74.27%) and Steven Paysu (61.80%).

Berdin's performance during the daily rounds of Season 2, Quarter IV of TNT until the Grand finals were published on ABS-CBN Entertainment's YouTube channel  The videos of these performance were Top Trending for days and went viral on YouTube and within a month of publishing, the top 2 videos have reached over 8.7 million views and all the other videos have racked over 1 million views. With her popular renditions of Filipino songs, she was nicknamed as the New Gem of OPM.

The livestream video of “Tawag ng Tanghalan” at the day of the Grand finals on June 2, 2018 also made a record of 100,000 concurrent viewers on YouTube. As of June 24, 2018, the TNT video performance of Berdin had already accumulated over 60 million views (18 videos).

ABS-CBN's TNTVersions YouTube channelopened a new online video blog series entitled TNTVlog featuring Berdin as the official host, the 1st episode was published on June 21, 2018.

In December 2018, Berdin's grand final performance of Bamboo songs medley was named as the second top trending videos that entertained Filipinos in 2018 according to YouTube Rewind.

2018 to present: Post Tawag ng Tanghalan and breakthrough

On July 7, 2018, Berdin signed for a recording contract with the new label TNT Records under Star Music where she performed live for her new carrier single Biyaya written by Chochay Magno. The new single was released on Spotify, Apple Music, Amazon Music and other music streaming platforms starting July 27, 2018.

Berdin was announced to be part of a major concert set to be held on July 28, 2018 at the Araneta Coliseum dubbed as TNT All Star Showdown. She was introduced as one of the headliners with Season 1 Grand Champion Noven Belleza, Finalist Sam Mangubat and the TNT Boys. After a successful result, the sold-out concert was followed by TNT All Star Showdown - Cebu held at the Hoops Dome, Lapu Lapu City on September 21, 2018.

On September 25, 2018, Berdin was honored to receive the formal invitation to attend the ABS-CBN Ball for the first time. Berdin belted out a performance together with her idols KZ Tandingan and Yeng Constantino during the ABS-CBN Ball.

On September 26, 2018, Berdin was announced to interpret and record Mas Mabuti Pa, composed by Mhonver Lopez & Joanna Concepcion. The song earned Star Music Listeners Choice Award and 4th best song for the Himig Handog 2018 P-Pop Love Songs.

On October 7, 2018, Berdin performed the Opening theme of the drama series Kadenang Ginto during ASAP. The song entitled Nasa Puso is composed by Jeremy Sarmiento.

On December 20, 2018, Berdin announced on Magandang Buhay that she was recently confirmed as an ASAP regular co-host and performer.

In July 2019, Berdin once again interpreted a song, "Sa'yong Mundo", an entry for the top 12 Himig Handog 2019. The song is written by Noel Zuniga Cabalquinto.

In August 2019, Berdin became a member of the girl group J.E.Z. together with Elha Nympha and Zephanie. One of the guesting at GGV mash-up performance of J.E.Z. gained more than 9million streams on YouTube The group took a hiatus in March 2020 until Sheena Belarmino joined the group in January 2021 and Zephanie returned to the group 2 months later. The newly revived group, now branded as New Gen Divas or New Gen Birit Divas, would debut on April 25, 2021, with Janine representing the color red in the said group.

Some time in July 2021, she, along with her co-member Zephanie were unavailable to perform for the New Gen Divas due to prior commitments for the taping cycle that had to be done prior to the reimposition of the enhanced community quarantine in Metro Manila. They were temporarily replaced by Gigi de Lana and Lara Maigue. She would later return to the group in September 2021, following the group's appearance on Madlang Pi-Poll, a segment of It's Showtime.

Personal life
By October 2019, the Philippine press reported that Janine took more than a month-long break from performing.  She explained that it was early September when she was found to have had "vocal nodules" and was treated with steroids.  She was later diagnosed with Cushing's Syndrome, a side effect from her medication.

On November 30, 2019, she returned to perform the opening production on It's Showtime.

Discography

Albums

Singles

Awards and nominations

Concerts

Filmography

Television

References

External links

2002 births
Filipino women pop singers
Filipino YouTubers
Participants in Philippine reality television series
Tawag ng Tanghalan contestants
Living people
ABS-CBN personalities
21st-century Filipino women singers
Star Circle Quest participants
Star Music artists